E-commerce China Dangdang Inc., known as Dangdang, is a Chinese electronic commerce company, founded by Peggy Yu and Li Guoqing in 1999. It is headquartered in Beijing and its main competitors are Amazon.cn (or Amazon China, formerly Joyo.com) and JD.com (or Jingdong, formerly 360buy.com). The competition escalated into a price war in December 2010, with each retailer marking down a wide range of items, especially books. DangDang made an IPO on the NYSE in November 2010, estimated at approximately US$1 billion.

Products 

Dangdang's main product categories include household merchandise, cosmetics, digital, home appliances, books, audio, and dozens of clothing and maternal and child categories. There are over 10 million new registered customers per year in Dangdang . More than 100 thousand people buy things from Dangdang each day. There are about 30 million people a month browse different kinds of products each month. The monthly sale of goods in Dangdang is over 20 million.

Dangdang sells over 200,000 kinds of books and 10,000 kinds of software and audio products, which make up 90% of the category in China mainland. There are about 3,000 employees in Dangdang, and its customers are among 50 countries, and over 40% B2C customers in China have shopping experiences with Dangdang.

History 
 November 1999: Website launched
 February 2000: Dangdang raises venture capital
 July 2001: Daily unique visitors exceed 500,000, Dangdang becomes the busiest books and video store
 February 2004: Dangdang raises a second round of venture capital of $11 million from Tiger Management
 April 2004: Dangdang expands their business to general merchandise, and has sold commodities
 July 2006: Dangdang raises a third round of venture capital of $27 million from DCM, Walden International and Alto Global Investment
 October 2006: Dangdang launches a personalized product recommendation function 
 September 2009: Dangdang is the first to introduce mobile device purchasing options in Chinese B2C e-commerce
 December 2010: Dangdang is successfully listed on the NYSE in the U.S.
 July 2015: Dangdang Chairwoman Peggy Yu and CEO Quoqing Li proposed to buyout the company at $7.81 per ADS, which is less than half of its IPO value and even well below the prior 30 days average stock price. Bloomberg reported that Dangdang's buyout proposal is the lowest among all Chinese ADRs seeking to go private historically.
 August 2015: Dangdang shareholders widely protested against the $7.81 per ADS buyout offer by its management team and launched a shareholder protest website - dangdangfacts.com
 May 2015: Dangdang Special Committee approved the management buyout at $6.7 per ADS. 
 August 2015: Many shareholders of Dangdang chose to dissent from the Merger by exercising shareholder appraisal rights according to Cayman Companies Law Section 238. 
 September 2015: Dangdang completes its go-private. 
 November 2015: Merger dispute litigation between Dangdang and 3% shareholders at Cayman Islands Grand Court. The litigation progress is documented at dangdangfacts.com

References

External links 
  

Companies formerly listed on the New York Stock Exchange
Companies based in Beijing
Internet properties established in 1999
Retail companies established in 1999
Online retailers of China
1999 establishments in China
2010 initial public offerings